This is a list of Italian football transfers for co-ownership resolutions, for the 2000-01 season, from and to Serie A and Serie B.

According to Article 102 bis of NOIF (Norme Organizzative Interne della F.I.G.C). The co-ownership deal must be confirmed each year. The deal may expired, renewed, bought back or sold outright. Deals that failed to form an agreement after the deadline, will be defined by auction between the 2 clubs. Which the club will submit their bid in a sealed envelope. Non-submission may lead to the rights is free to give to the opposite side. The mother club could sell their rights to third parties.

Co-ownership

References
 
specific

External links

Italy
Trans
2000